Eastham House, also known as Glenn Manor, is a historic home located at Point Pleasant, Mason County, West Virginia.  It was built about 1850, and is a two-story, "L"-shaped, brick residence with a low-pitched, slate covered gable roof in the Greek Revival-style. Also on the property is a contributing c. 1820 smokehouse.

It was listed on the National Register of Historic Places in 1988.

References

Houses on the National Register of Historic Places in West Virginia
Greek Revival houses in West Virginia
Houses completed in 1850
Houses in Mason County, West Virginia
National Register of Historic Places in Mason County, West Virginia
Point Pleasant, West Virginia